Dungeness, Romney Marsh and Rye Bay is a  biological and geological Site of Special Scientific Interest which stretches from New Romney in Kent to Winchelsea in East Sussex. Part of the site is in the High Weald Area of Outstanding Natural Beauty, parts are Geological Conservation Review sites, part is a Local Nature Reserve, and part is a Royal Society for the Protection of Birds nature reserve, and part is a National Nature Reserve.

Nationally important habitats in this site are saltmarsh, sand dunes, vegetated shingle, saline lagoons, standing waters, lowland ditch systems, and basin fens, and it has many rare and endangered species of fauna and flora. It is geologically important as its deposits display the chronology of coastal evolution.

References

Sites of Special Scientific Interest in East Sussex
Sites of Special Scientific Interest in Kent
Sites of Special Scientific Interest notified in 2006
Geological Conservation Review sites